Elsie May Kittredge (May 14, 1870 – 1954) was an American botanist, photographer, and curator for the New York Botanical Gardens.

References

1870 births
1954 deaths
American women botanists
19th-century American botanists
20th-century American botanists
20th-century American women photographers
20th-century American photographers
19th-century American women photographers
19th-century American photographers
20th-century American women scientists